Greg Gaines (born May 6, 1996) is an American football nose tackle who is a free agent. He played college football at Washington.

Early years
Gaines attended La Habra High School in La Habra, California. Gaines originally committed to attend Boise State, but followed head coach Chris Petersen from Boise State to Washington when he became head coach.

College career
Gaines played at Washington from 2015 to 2018, with 2014 serving as a red-shirt season. He earned honorable mention All-Pac-12 in 2016 as a defensive lineman, second-team All-Pac-12 in 2017, and first-team All-Pac-12 in 2018.
In 2018 he won the Morris Trophy, given annually to the best defensive lineman in the Pac-12 Conference as voted on by opposing players.

Professional career

Gaines was selected by the Los Angeles Rams in the fourth round (134th overall) of the 2019 NFL Draft. Gaines won Super Bowl LVI when the Rams defeated the Cincinnati Bengals 23-20. Gaines recorded 3 tackles in the game.

References

External links
 Washington Huskies profile

1996 births
Living people
American football defensive linemen
Los Angeles Rams players
People from La Habra, California
Players of American football from California
Sportspeople from Orange County, California
Washington Huskies football players